John Stourton may refer to:

John Stourton (died 1438), MP for Somerset
John Stourton, 1st Baron Stourton (1400–1462), English soldier and politician
John Stourton, 3rd Baron Stourton (c1454–1485), English peer
John Stourton, 9th Baron Stourton (1553–1588), English peer
John Stourton (politician) (1899–1992), British Member of Parliament (1931–1945)

See also
John Stoughton (disambiguation)